Tim Shallenburger (born March 14, 1954) was Speaker of the Kansas House of Representatives and the Kansas State Treasurer.

Biography
Shallenburger was raised in Baxter Springs, Kansas. He attended Pittsburg State University and Coffeyville Community College.

Career
Shallenburger was a member of the House of Representatives from 1987 to 1998, serving as Speaker from 1995 to 1998. He was then Treasurer from 1999 to 2003, at which time he was succeeded by Lynn Jenkins, who later became a member of the United States House of Representatives. In 2002, Shallenburger ran for Governor of Kansas, losing to Democrat Kathleen Sebelius, who later became United States Secretary of Health and Human Services.  He served as the Legislative Director for the Office of Governor Sam Brownback.

References

Candidates in the 2002 United States elections
21st-century American politicians
Coffeyville Community College alumni
Living people
People from Baxter Springs, Kansas
Pittsburg State University alumni
Speakers of the Kansas House of Representatives
Republican Party members of the Kansas House of Representatives
State treasurers of Kansas
1954 births
20th-century American politicians